Jake Carl Speight (born 28 September 1985) is an English former professional footballer who played as a striker. He now works as a football agent.

Starting his career working through the Sheffield United youth team, in 2005 he signed with Scarborough, and later Bury. He dropped down to Conference football between 2007 and 2010, playing for Northwich Victoria, Farsley Celtic, Droylsden, and Mansfield Town. In 2010, he was signed by Bradford City, and was quickly sent out on loan to Port Vale, before signing permanently for Wrexham the following year. He returned to Mansfield Town in July 2012, and helped the club to the Conference Premier title in 2012–13. He was loaned out to Alfreton Town in October 2013. He signed with Harrogate Town in July 2014, and returned to Alfreton Town on loan in March 2015 before he was transferred to King's Lynn Town in August 2015.

Career

Early career
Speight began his career at Sheffield United, and was loaned out to Conference Premier side Leigh RMI in March 2005 to gain experience, along with Colin Marrison. He joined Scarborough on work experience in August 2005, scoring in both his first two appearances for the club, and impressing manager Nick Henry. He was allowed to join the "Seadogs" permanently, and therefore never made an appearance for the "Blades". Three months later he switched to Bury, of League Two. On 13 January 2006, he scored his first and second league goals, in a 3–2 victory over Torquay United. He finished the season with two goals in seventeen appearances. He made another seventeen appearances for Bury in 2006–07, mostly as a substitute, and failed to find the net all season. He was released by the club in June 2007.

Following his release from Bury, Speight dropped back into non-league football, signing for Northwich Victoria. He joined Conference North club Farsley Celtic in the summer of 2008, and then moved to Droylsden in March 2009. In May 2009, Speight joined Mansfield Town. He played 33 games, and scored 17 goals, becoming the club's top scorer despite having made most of his appearances as a substitute.

Bradford City
In June 2010, Bradford City bought Speight for £25,000, offering the player a two-year contract. "Stags" fans were disappointed at the fee, many had expected it to be much higher. He started his spell with his new club by receiving a jail sentence for assault – without having informed the club beforehand that he had a court case. His work rate on the pitch made him popular with supporters, but he found just one goal in twelve appearances. On 29 October 2010 he joined League Two promotion chasers Port Vale on a one-month loan. Manager Micky Adams had looked to sign the player permanently before he went to Bradford. His appearance in a goalless draw at the Pirelli Stadium with Burton Albion on 2 November 2010 earned Speight the honour of being the 1,000th player to play for Port Vale in the Football League. After scoring in a 5–0 win over Stockport County, Speight's loan spell was extended for a second month. He returned to Bradford in the new year.

Wrexham
In June 2011, he signed a two-year contract with Conference side Wrexham for an undisclosed fee. Manager Dean Saunders hoped he would prove an adequate replacement for outgoing striker Andy Mangan. After failing to score in his first four games, he opened his goal account for the "Reds" with a hat-trick over Alfreton Town in a 4–1 win at North Street. From 30 November to 18 February he scored in seven out of eight league appearances, and from 10 March to 14 April he hit seven goals in six games. He ended the season with 21 goals in 38 Conference games to become Wrexham's top scorer and the sixth most prolific scorer in the Conference. Wrexham picked up 98 points and finished second, but failed to win promotion after losing to Luton Town in the play-offs. His record led to him becoming a target of Lincoln City manager David Holdsworth.

Mansfield Town
Speight re-joined former club Mansfield Town in July 2012 for an undisclosed fee. He was reported to have requested the transfer so as to be closer to his Sheffield home. Though Speight said that claims he handed in a transfer request were "a complete lie". He scored twice in his first game back at Field Mill, in a 4–3 defeat to Newport County. Mansfield won promotion into the Football League as Conference champions in 2012–13, though Speight missed the second half of the campaign after damaging cartilage in his knee.

In October 2013, he joined Alfreton Town on a one-month loan deal. He scored four goals in five games for the "Reds", and manager Nicky Law was disappointed when his loan spell at North Street was cut short by Mansfield the following month. However, he picked up a serious knee injury midway through the 2013–14 season and was ruled out of action until late March. Speight was released by Mansfield manager Paul Cox at the end of the 2013–14 season.

Non-league
In July 2014, Speight dropped down two divisions to the Conference North to join Harrogate Town in a move that reunited him with manager Simon Weaver, his former teammate at Scarborough. He was unable to take part in pre-season training due to injury. On 20 March 2015, Speight re-joined Alfreton Town on a loan deal keeping him at the club until the end of the 2014–15 season.

In August 2015, Speight dropped down a division to the Southern League to join Gary Setchell's King's Lynn Town. Setchell said that Speight would prove to be a "very, very valuable acquisition". He left King's Lynn in October 2015; manager Gary Setchell stated that "he will probably retire now and he is also putting a lot of time into a new business venture".

Personal life
In July 2010 Speight was jailed for 12 weeks after pleading guilty to assault. Speight appealed his sentence a week later and he was released from prison; a Crown Court judge ordered his sentence to be suspended for 18 months and that Speight conduct 100 hours of community work.

In 2015, he became a sports agent, licensed by The Football Association.

Career statistics

References

External links

1985 births
Living people
Footballers from Sheffield
English footballers
Black British sportsmen
Association football forwards
Sheffield United F.C. players
Leigh Genesis F.C. players
Scarborough F.C. players
Bury F.C. players
Northwich Victoria F.C. players
Farsley Celtic A.F.C. players
Droylsden F.C. players
Mansfield Town F.C. players
Bradford City A.F.C. players
Port Vale F.C. players
Wrexham A.F.C. players
Alfreton Town F.C. players
Harrogate Town A.F.C. players
King's Lynn Town F.C. players
English Football League players
National League (English football) players
Southern Football League players
English people convicted of assault
British sports agents
Association football agents